Henry Meulen (1882–1978) was a British individualist anarchist, economist, and proponent of free banking.

See also
Friedrich Hayek, also supported free banking

References
 Meulen, Henry. Banking and the Social Problem. 1909
 Meulen, Henry. Free banking. 1934.
 Meulen, Henry. Free Banking. An outline of a policy of individualism. 1934
 Meulen, Henry. Individualist Anarchism (Reprinted from "The Word," November 1949. With a portrait.) 1949
 Meulen, Henry. Industrial Justice through Banking Reform. An outline of a policy of individualism. 1917
 Dowd, Kevin. The monetary economics of Henry Meulen. 1988.
 The price of gold. By T. Goeritz and H. Meulen. 3rd ed. 1972

External links
 Part I of Instead of a Magazine Correspondence between Beckerath and Muelen Part II Part III Part IV Part V Part VI edited by John Zube

English anarchists
Individualist anarchists
British economists
1882 births
1978 deaths